The Women's keirin was one of the 7 women's events held at the 2007 UCI Track Cycling World Championships, held in Palma de Mallorca, Spain.

22 cyclists from 15 countries participated in the contest. After the 4 qualifying heats, the fastest 2 riders in each heat advance to the second round. The remaining ones face a first round repechage.

The riders that did not advance to the second round race in 2 repechage heats. The first 2 riders in each heat advance to the second round along with the 8 that qualified before.

The first 3 riders from each of the 2 Second Round heats advance to the Final and the remaining will race a consolation 7-12 final.

The whole event took place on April 1. The First Round and Repechage on the morning session and the Second Round and Finals on the evening session. The Final started at 18:40.

First round

Heat 1

Heat 2

Heat 3

Heat 4

First Round Repechage

Heat 1

Heat 2

Second round

Heat 1

Heat 2

Finals

Final 1-6

Final 7-12

References

Women's keirin
UCI Track Cycling World Championships – Women's keirin
UCI